Four ships of the United States Navy have borne the name USS Sterett in honor of Master Commandant Andrew Sterett (1778–1807), who served during the Quasi-War with France and the Barbary Wars.

The first , a three-stack, modified  (a type of ship often referred to as a "flivver") saw action during World War I.
The third , a  guided missile cruiser, saw action in the Vietnam War and the Cold War.
The fourth  an  commissioned on 9 August 2008.

United States Navy ship names